The 1930 All-Ireland Senior Football Championship was the 44th staging of Ireland's premier Gaelic football knock-out competition. Kerry were the winners of the competition.

Results

Connacht Senior Football Championship

An objection was made and Mayo were awarded the win.

Leinster Senior Football Championship

Although Kildare won the match, Offaly still played against a Semi-final against Carlow.

Munster Senior Football Championship

Ulster Senior Football Championship

There was not time for a replay so Armagh advanced.

Fermanagh objected and were allowed another quarter-final, against Cavan.

All-Ireland Senior Football Championship

Championship statistics

Miscellaneous

 The Armagh-Tyrone game ended in a draw but didn't go to a replay. Armagh decided to go straight to Ulster semi-final.
 Monaghan reach the All Ireland final for the first time ever but are beaten by Kerry.

References